George Prevost McKay (February 7, 1840 – August 22, 1924) was an Ontario businessman and political figure. He represented Simcoe South in the Legislative Assembly of Ontario as a Conservative member from 1883 to 1886.

McKay was born in West Gwillinbury Township, Simcoe County, Upper Canada in 1840, the son of D. Grant McKay, who came to Upper Canada from New Brunswick. He married Susie Douse and opened one of the first stores in Lefroy. He also served as reeve for Innisfil Township. In 1883, he moved to Toronto, where he worked for the Credit-Foncier Loan Company. He died there in 1924.

External links 
The Canadian parliamentary companion, 1885 JA Gemmill

Historical review ... Innisfil Township Centennial (1951)

Progressive Conservative Party of Ontario MPPs
1840 births
1924 deaths